Øyene (the Islands) is a local Norwegian newspaper published in the municipality of Nøtterøy in Vestfold county.

Øyene is published once a week, on Thursdays, and covers events in the municipalities of Nøtterøy and Tjøme. It is politically independent and was established in 1999. The newspaper's office is in Teie. It is edited by Tor Aslesen. Øyene was named Norway's Local Newspaper of the Year (Årets lokalavis) in 2006 and 2007.

Circulation
According to the Norwegian Audit Bureau of Circulations and National Association of Local Newspapers, Øyene has had the following annual circulation:
 2006: 4,087
 2007: 4,295
 2008: 4,404
 2009: 4,326
 2010: 4,311
 2011: 4,277
 2012: 4,011
 2013: 3,802
 2014: 3,623
 2015: 3,570
 2016: 3,473
 2017: 3,601

References

External links
Øyene homepage

Newspapers published in Norway
Norwegian-language newspapers
Nøtterøy
Mass media in Vestfold
Publications established in 1999
1999 establishments in Norway